Eagle Township, Kansas may refer to the following places in Kansas:

 Eagle Township, Barber County, Kansas
 Eagle Township, Kingman County, Kansas

See also
 List of Kansas townships
 Eagle Township (disambiguation)

Kansas township disambiguation pages